Myziane Maolida (born 14 February 1999) is a French professional footballer who plays as a forward for  club Reims, on loan from Bundesliga club Hertha BSC.

Club career

Lyon
Maolida developed through the Lyon academy. He made his Ligue 1 debut on 5 August 2017 in a 4–0 home win against Strasbourg. He entered the field after 76 minutes for Mariano. He scored his first goal on 23 November 2017 in a 4–0 victory over Apollon Limassol in the UEFA Europa League. Three days later, he scored his first goal in Ligue 1 in a 5–0 away win against Nice.

Nice
In August 2018, Maolida signed with Ligue 1 side Nice agreeing a five-year contract with a reported release clause of about €100 million. Lyon received a transfer fee of €10 million plus 30% from future transfer profits.

Hertha BSC
On 31 August 2021, Maolida signed a four-year contract with Bundesliga club Hertha BSC. He immediately scored in his league debut on 12 September in a 3–1 away victory over VfL Bochum. In the 2021–22 season, Maolida made 14 league appearances, scoring the one goal, as he was mainly a substitute. Finishing 16th in the league table, Hertha BSC retained their Bundesliga status after beating out Hamburger SV in playoffs for promotion and relegation. Maolida appeared in both games as a late substitute.

Loan to Reims
On 31 January 2023, Maolida joined Reims back in France until the end of the 2022–23 season.

International career
Born in France to Comorian and Malagasy parents, Maolida is a youth international for France.

Career statistics

1Includes UEFA Europa League appearances.
2Includes Bundesliga promotion/relegation playoff appearances.

References

External links
 
 
 

1999 births
Footballers from Paris
French sportspeople of Comorian descent
Living people
French footballers
Association football midfielders
France youth international footballers
France under-21 international footballers
Olympique Lyonnais players
OGC Nice players
Hertha BSC players
Stade de Reims players
Ligue 1 players
Championnat National 2 players
Bundesliga players
French expatriate footballers
Expatriate footballers in Germany
French expatriate sportspeople in Germany